Lt.-Col. Richard Magenis ( – 6 March 1831) was an Anglo-Irish Unionist politician who sat in the Irish House of Commons and British House of Commons for Enniskillen. 

Magenis represented Enniskillen in the Irish Parliament from 1790 to 1797. Following the Union of Great Britain and Ireland in 1801, he represented Enniskillen as a Tory from 26 October 1812 to 29 January 1828.

He was a Lieutenant-Colonel in the Fermanagh Militia.

Magenis, whose surname is also spelt Magennis or Maginnis, was Anglo-Irish gentry, member of Magenis of Finvoy Lodge. He was the eldest son of Richard Magenis and his second wife, Elizabeth Berkeley, daughter of Col. William Berkeley and sister of George Berkeley, Bishop of Cloyne. He was the elder brother of the Very Rev. William Magenis, Dean of Kilmore.

Marriage and issue

Magenis married firstly, 1788, Lady Elizabeth Anne Cole (died 26 May 1807), daughter of William Cole, 1st Earl of Enniskillen and niece of Hon. Arthur Cole-Hamilton, with whom he represented Enniskillen. They had five sons and four daughters.

Richard William Magenis, his heir
William John Cole Magenis
Lieut.-Col. Henry Arthur Magenis (July 1795 – 11 June 1828) of the 87th Royal Irish Fusiliers
John Balfour Magenis (died 1862), married Frances Margaretta Moore, daughter of Judge Arthur Moore and Frances Stoney 
Sir Arthur Magenis  (–1867), British diplomat 
Anne Louise Magenis (died 1855), married in 1821 David Albemarle Bertie Dewar 
Elizabeth Anne Magenis (died 1882), married James Wilmot Williams, of Heringston, Dorset 
Florence Sarah Magenis, died unmarried
Florence Catherine Magenis (died 1837), married in 1821 John Ashley Warre 

Magenis married secondly, Elizabeth Callander, widow of Col. George Dashwood, and daughter of James Callander Campbell, of Craigforth, a claimant of the Campbell baronetcy. With her he had a sixth son:

 Frederick Richard Magenis (1816–1866), died unmarried

References

1760s births
1831 deaths
Irish Anglicans
19th-century Irish people
Politicians from County Down
UK MPs 1812–1818
UK MPs 1818–1820
UK MPs 1820–1826
Members of the Parliament of the United Kingdom for County Fermanagh constituencies (1801–1922)